Kevin Ryan may refer to:


People

Politicians
Kevin J. Ryan (born 1969), member of the New Jersey General Assembly
 Kevin Ryan, member of the Connecticut House of Representatives

Sports
Kevin Ryan (athlete) (born 1949), long-distance runner from New Zealand
Kevin Ryan (Australian rules footballer) (born 1937), former Australian rules footballer
Kevin Ryan (hurler) (born 1965), Irish hurling manager and former player
Kevin Ryan (rugby) (born 1934), Australian sportsman, lawyer and politician

Other people
Kevin Ryan (actor) (born 1984), Irish-born film and television actor
Kevin Ryan (charity executive) (born 1967), President and CEO of the charity Covenant House International
Kevin A. Ryan (born 1932), founder and director emeritus of the Center for the Advancement of Ethics and Character at Boston University
Kevin P. Ryan, American entrepreneur, founder and CEO of Gilt Groupe, and former DoubleClick CEO
Kevin V. Ryan (born 1957), American attorney, former U.S. Attorney for the Northern District of California
Kevin Ryan (science fiction author), American author of Star Trek novels

Characters
Kevin Ryan (Castle), from the American TV show Castle